Events in the year 2022 in Jordan.

Incumbents
 Monarch – Abdullah II of Jordan
 Prime Minister of Jordan – Bisher Al-Khasawneh

Events
 27 June – A chlorine gas leak at Aqaba port kills 13 people and injures at least 260 people.
 15 December – 2022 Jordanian protests begin over rising fuel prices.

References

 

2022 in Jordan
Jordan
Jordan
2020s in Jordan
Years of the 21st century in Jordan